Imeni Voroshilova is the former name of the following places:

Hatsik, Armavir, Armenia
Jer-Uy, Issyk-Kul region, Kyrgyzstan